Bella Unión is a city in the north part of Artigas Department of Uruguay.

History
The original settlement was founded on 13 May 1829 under the name "Santa Rosa". It was started by Fructuoso Rivera, who played a prominent role in the early history of Uruguay. On 20 April 1928, it was renamed to "Bella Unión" by the Act of Ley No. 8.207. On 15 October 1963, its status was raised to "Ciudad" (city) by the Act of Ley No. 13.180.

Population
In 2011, Bella Unión had a population of 12,200. Together with its peripheral populated and rural areas (Coronado, Portones de Hierro y Campodónico, Las Piedras, Franquia & Cuareim) they form a population centre of around 18,000.
 
Source: Instituto Nacional de Estadística de Uruguay

Geography
It is located at the north end of Route 3, on the banks of the Uruguay River, near the mouth of Río Cuareim.

Climate

Places of worship
 St. Rose of Lima of the Cuareim Parish Church (Roman Catholic)

Notable local person
The writer Jesús Moraes, (1955-), who specializes in short stories in Spanish, is from Bella Unión, and is one of the relatively few contemporary Uruguayan writers strongly identified with the Uruguayan north.

References

External links

:es:Fructuoso Rivera
 INE map of Bella Unión, Coronado, Las Piedras and Portones de Hierro y Campodónico
The Community Website

Populated places in the Artigas Department
Uruguay River
Populated places established in 1829
Argentina–Uruguay border crossings
Brazil–Uruguay border crossings
Port cities and towns in Uruguay